California High School (CHS) is a public high school in South Whittier, California and belongs to the Whittier Union High School District.

"Cal Hi", as it is known, is home to the Condors, with around 3,100 students currently attending. The mascot is the condor and the school colors are navy and gold. The campus is located outside the city limits of Whittier in unincorporated South Whittier.

It has been recently honored as a California Distinguished School, and is highly praised for its academies. It also offers a Latin program. Many sports are offered, such as golf, soccer, tennis, water polo, swimming, softball, baseball, volleyball, cross-country, wrestling, track, cheerleading and football. The band has also won many commendations and awards, including sweepstakes at the local Band Jam competition 4 years running under the direction of Doug Nordquist (2004–2006), and has ranked 6th in the SCSBOA Marching Band Championship Competition.

Academies

These three-year programs teach students about their chosen course of study during their Sophomore, Junior, and Senior year.

 Architecture & Engineering (A&E)
 Automotive Academy
 Business Academy
 Culinary Academy
 Health Academy
 Puente Program (four-year program)
 Scholar's Academy (four-year program)

Notable alumni

Anthony Reyes – Major League Baseball pitcher. Currently in the minors with the Cleveland Indians. Pitched and won Game 1 of the 2006 World Series with the St. Louis Cardinals.
Nicolas Grigsby – NFL running back for the Miami Dolphins, Raiders, and Tampa Bay Buccaneers.
Craig McCraken -Director/Writer/Cartoonist of The Powerpuff Girls, Foster's Home for Imaginary Friends, and Wander Over Yonder
Anthony Rendon (politician) – Representative of California's 63rd District, Speaker of the California State Assembly 
Jim Vellone NFL Offensive Lineman for Minnesota Vikings
Kerry Wendell Thornley

References

External links
 California High School
 WUHSD Site

High schools in Los Angeles County, California
Public high schools in California
1954 establishments in California